HMS Li Wo was an auxiliary patrol vessel of the British Royal Navy, which was sunk on 14 February 1942 by Japanese warships as she single-handedly attacked an enemy convoy during the Malayan Campaign.

Ship history
The Li Wo was a passenger riverboat built by the Hong Kong & Whampoa Dock Company for the Indo-China Steam Navigation Company Ltd. for service on the Yangtze River. In 1940 she was requisitioned and commissioned into the Royal Navy at Singapore.

Shortly before the British surrender, Li Wo was ordered to head for the safety of Batavia in the Dutch East Indies. Her crew consisted of 84 men, mostly naval reservists, but also included several survivors from the Prince of Wales and Repulse, five men from the Army, two from the RAF, ten Malayans, and six Chinese.

She left Singapore at dawn on 13 February 1942, and was attacked several times from the air, suffering some damage. The next day  while passing north of the Bangka Strait, she encountered a convoy of Japanese transport ships accompanied by a squadron of warships launching "Operation L", the invasion of Sumatra. The commander of Li Wo, Temporary Lieutenant Thomas Wilkinson RNR, informed the ship's company that he intended to close and attack the enemy.

Li Wo altered course towards the leading transport ship of the convoy at full speed, unfurling her battle ensign, and opening fire with her four-inch gun (for which she had only 13 shells, plus three practice rounds). She scored a number of direct hits on the transport, starting fires aboard, and causing the troops aboard to abandon ship. She then attacked another transport ship with machine gun fire.

Out of ammunition and now sinking,  she rammed the first enemy transport, which later sank, before finally sinking herself. Of the 84 crew, only 7 survived to be taken prisoner.

Awards
Lieutenant Wilkinson, the captain, posthumously received the Victoria Cross, while his first lieutenant, Temporary Sub-Lieutenant Ronald George Gladstone Stanton RNR was awarded the Distinguished Service Order. The Conspicuous Gallantry Medal was awarded to Acting Petty Officer Arthur William Thompson, and the Distinguished Service Medal to Leading Seaman Victor Spencer and Able Seaman Albert Spendlove. There were also six Mentions in Despatches, three of them posthumous.

References

External links

Further reading
 

1938 ships
Ships built in Hong Kong
Patrol vessels of the Royal Navy
World War II patrol boats of the United Kingdom
Maritime incidents in February 1942
World War II shipwrecks in the Java Sea
Ships built by the Hong Kong & Whampoa Dock Company